Thrills Incorporated was an Australian science fiction magazine.

Amazing Science Stories
Amazing Science Stories was a British science fiction magazine which published two undated issues in 1951. The publisher was Pemberton's, of Manchester; the editor was not identified, but may have been Stafford Pemberton.  The contents included reprints from Thrills Incorporated, and also from Super Science Stories, which had had a British edition, published by Pemberton's.

Notes

References

Defunct science fiction magazines published in the United Kingdom
Monthly magazines published in the United Kingdom
Magazines established in 1951
Magazines disestablished in 1951
Magazines published in Manchester